The Glory of Yolanda is a 1917 American silent romantic drama film directed by Marguerite Bertsch and starring Anita Stewart. It was produced by the Vitagraph Company of America and distributed by V-L-S-E, a releasing company whose name is composed of the initials of Vitagraph, Lubin, Selig and Essanay.

Cast
Anita Stewart as Yolanda
John Ardizoni as Grand Duke Boris
Denton Vane as Prince Drolinski
Evart Overton as Alexander
Mr. Turin as Serge
Bernard Siegel as Paul
Madam Roimonda as Olga

Preservation
With no prints of The Glory of Yolanda located in any film archives, it is a lost film.

References

External links

Lobby poster

1917 films
American silent feature films
Vitagraph Studios films
Lost American films
1917 romantic drama films
American black-and-white films
American romantic drama films
1910s English-language films
1910s American films
Silent romantic drama films
Silent American drama films